Denis McBride may refer to:

 Denis McBride (priest), Redemptorist priest from Scotland
 Denis McBride (rugby union) (born 1964), retired Irish rugby union player